Robert E. Thompson (November 3, 1924 – February 11, 2004) was an American screenwriter.

Thompson was known for such films as The Trial of Lee Harvey Oswald, A Case of Rape and They Shoot Horses, Don't They?

He was nominated for an Academy Award for They Shoot Horses, Don't They?

Filmography

References

External links

1924 births
2004 deaths
American television writers
American male screenwriters
American male television writers
20th-century American male writers
20th-century American screenwriters